The Taipei Grand Prix, ATP Taipei in its final year, was a men's tennis tournament played in Taipei, Taiwan. The event was held from 1977–1984 and was part of the Grand Prix Tennis Circuit It emerged for one last time in 1992. The event was played on indoor carpet courts.

Finals

Singles

Doubles

See also
 Taipei Women's Championships
 List of sporting events in Taiwan

External links
 ATP World Tour archive

Carpet court tennis tournaments
Grand Prix tennis circuit
Indoor tennis tournaments
Recurring sporting events established in 1977
Sport in Taipei
Tennis tournaments in Taiwan
1992 disestablishments in Taiwan
ATP Tour
Defunct tennis tournaments in Asia
Defunct sports competitions in Taiwan